West Harbour is an affluent suburb of Auckland, located to the west of the Auckland isthmus and CBD. It is named for its location on the western side of the Waitematā Harbour. West Harbour is under the governance of Auckland Council after the amalgamation of district councils in 2010.

Local features include many public reserves (the most prominent being Luckens Reserve, which in 2014 received a basketball court), tennis courts, two local primary schools, West Harbour School and Marina View School, a Church, and farm land. West Harbour is home to Hobsonville Marina, a large marina catering to around 600 of private leisure boats and yachts, which was part of the route the Royal Family took during their 2014 visit. As the unique terrain of West Harbour, most of the houses have a magnificent sea view and city view, which makes the suburb one of the exclusive suburbs in Auckland City and home to hundreds of multi-million dollar houses and mansions. West Harbour has the highest median house price in Waitakere City.

Demographics

West Harbour had a population of 11,373 at the 2018 New Zealand census, an increase of 522 people (4.8%) since the 2013 census, and an increase of 546 people (5.0%) since the 2006 census. There were 3,468 households, comprising 5,643 males and 5,730 females, giving a sex ratio of 0.98 males per female, with 2,445 people (21.5%) aged under 15 years, 2,349 (20.7%) aged 15 to 29, 5,331 (46.9%) aged 30 to 64, and 1,251 (11.0%) aged 65 or older.

Ethnicities were 58.8% European/Pākehā, 11.7% Māori, 10.5% Pacific peoples, 28.9% Asian, and 3.6% other ethnicities. People may identify with more than one ethnicity.

The percentage of people born overseas was 37.5, compared with 27.1% nationally.

Although some people chose not to answer the census's question about religious affiliation, 49.4% had no religion, 34.6% were Christian, 0.9% had Māori religious beliefs, 3.1% were Hindu, 1.6% were Muslim, 2.3% were Buddhist and 1.5% had other religions.

Of those at least 15 years old, 2,292 (25.7%) people had a bachelor's or higher degree, and 1,218 (13.6%) people had no formal qualifications. 1,887 people (21.1%) earned over $70,000 compared to 17.2% nationally. The employment status of those at least 15 was that 4,737 (53.1%) people were employed full-time, 1,200 (13.4%) were part-time, and 336 (3.8%) were unemployed.

Education
Local State secondary schools are Hobsonville Point Secondary School,  Massey High School, Rutherford College, Henderson High School, Liston College, Waitakere College and St Dominic's College.

Gallery

References

Suburbs of Auckland
Upper Harbour Local Board Area
Populated places around the Waitematā Harbour
Henderson-Massey Local Board Area
West Auckland, New Zealand